Mario Tortul (25 February 1931 – 25 August 2008) was an Italian association football manager and footballer who played as a midfielder. On 11 November 1956, he represented the Italy national football team on the occasion of a 1955–60 Central European International Cup match against Switzerland in a 1–1 away draw.

References

1931 births
2008 deaths
Italian footballers
Italy international footballers
Association football midfielders
Serie A players
Serie C players
Taranto F.C. 1927 players
U.C. Sampdoria players
U.S. Triestina Calcio 1918 players
Calcio Padova players
U.S. Ancona 1905 players
Ternana Calcio players
S.S. Teramo Calcio players
A.C. Cuneo 1905 managers
Italian football managers
People from San Canzian d'Isonzo